RMS Corfu was a Royal Mail Ship and ocean liner operated by the Peninsular and Oriental Steam Navigation Company. Known as one of the 'Far East Sisters', she was launched in 1931 to serve the company's India and Far East Mail Service, along with her sister ship, the RMS Carthage. Both ships were built by Alexander Stephen & Sons Ltd in Glasgow, Scotland and served from 1931 until 1961 when they were scrapped in Japan.

World War II

In September 1939 Corfu was requisitioned by the British Admiralty and armed with eight 6-inch guns as part of her conversion to an armed merchant cruiser. She served as in this role as HMS Corfu until February 1944, and as a troop transport from then until the end of World War II. She was beached on 19 August for repairs to her bow and re-entered service in early 1941. 
On 7 October 1945 Corfu docked at Southampton carrying the first 1,500 British prisoners of war to return from Japanese camps in the Far East.
In 1947 she was returned to her owners.
She operated from Tilbury to Sydney as P&O Corfu in the 1950s

References

Bibliography

External links

Cruise ships
Ocean liners
Passenger ships of the United Kingdom
Ships of P&O (company)
Steamships
1931 ships
Corfu
Maritime incidents in July 1940
Maritime incidents in August 1940
World War II Auxiliary cruisers of the Royal Navy